Noor Ahmed Bhurgri is a Pakistani politician who had been a Member of the Provincial Assembly of Sindh, from November 2015 to May 2018.

Early life
He was born on 1 January 1945 in Mirpur Khas District.

Political career

He was elected to the Provincial Assembly of Sindh as a candidate of Pakistan Peoples Party (PPP) from Constituency PS-67 MIRPUR KHAS-CUM-UMERKOT in by-polls held in November 2015.

He was re-elected to Provincial Assembly of Sindh as a candidate of PPP from Constituency PS-49 (Mirpur Khas-III) in 2018 Pakistani general election.

References

Living people
Sindh MPAs 2013–2018
1945 births
Pakistan People's Party MPAs (Sindh)
Sindh MPAs 2018–2023